In seven-dimensional geometry, a hexicated 7-simplex is a convex uniform 7-polytope, including 6th-order truncations (hexication) from the regular 7-simplex.

There are 20 unique hexications for the 7-simplex, including all permutations of truncations, cantellations, runcinations, sterications, and pentellations.

The simple hexicated 7-simplex is also called an expanded 7-simplex, with only the first and last nodes ringed, is constructed by an expansion operation applied to the regular 7-simplex. The highest form, the hexipentisteriruncicantitruncated 7-simplex is more simply called a omnitruncated 7-simplex with all of the nodes ringed.

Hexicated 7-simplex

In seven-dimensional geometry, a hexicated 7-simplex is a convex uniform 7-polytope, a hexication (6th order truncation) of the regular 7-simplex, or alternately can be seen as an expansion operation.

Root vectors 

Its 56 vertices represent the root vectors of the simple Lie group A7.

Alternate names
 Expanded 7-simplex
 Small petated hexadecaexon (acronym: suph) (Jonathan Bowers)

Coordinates 
The vertices of the hexicated 7-simplex can be most simply positioned in 8-space as permutations of (0,1,1,1,1,1,1,2). This construction is based on facets of the hexicated 8-orthoplex, .

A second construction in 8-space, from the center of a rectified 8-orthoplex is given by coordinate permutations of:
 (1,-1,0,0,0,0,0,0)

Images

Hexitruncated 7-simplex

Alternate names
 Petitruncated octaexon (acronym: puto) (Jonathan Bowers)

Coordinates 

The vertices of the hexitruncated 7-simplex can be most simply positioned in 8-space as permutations of (0,1,1,1,1,1,2,3). This construction is based on facets of the hexitruncated 8-orthoplex, .

Images

Hexicantellated 7-simplex

Alternate names
 Petirhombated octaexon (acronym: puro) (Jonathan Bowers)

Coordinates 
The vertices of the hexicantellated 7-simplex can be most simply positioned in 8-space as permutations of (0,1,1,1,1,2,2,3). This construction is based on facets of the hexicantellated 8-orthoplex, .

Images

Hexiruncinated 7-simplex

Alternate names
 Petiprismated hexadecaexon (acronym: puph) (Jonathan Bowers)

Coordinates 

The vertices of the hexiruncinated 7-simplex can be most simply positioned in 8-space as permutations of (0,1,1,1,2,2,2,3). This construction is based on facets of the hexiruncinated 8-orthoplex, .

Images

Hexicantitruncated 7-simplex

Alternate names
 Petigreatorhombated octaexon (acronym: pugro) (Jonathan Bowers)

Coordinates 

The vertices of the hexicantitruncated 7-simplex can be most simply positioned in 8-space as permutations of (0,1,1,1,1,2,3,4). This construction is based on facets of the hexicantitruncated 8-orthoplex, .

Images

Hexiruncitruncated 7-simplex

Alternate names
 Petiprismatotruncated octaexon (acronym: pupato) (Jonathan Bowers)

Coordinates 
The vertices of the hexiruncitruncated 7-simplex can be most simply positioned in 8-space as permutations of (0,1,1,1,2,2,3,4). This construction is based on facets of the hexiruncitruncated 8-orthoplex, .

Images

Hexiruncicantellated 7-simplex 

In seven-dimensional geometry, a hexiruncicantellated 7-simplex is a uniform 7-polytope.

Alternate names
 Petiprismatorhombated octaexon (acronym: pupro) (Jonathan Bowers)

Coordinates 

The vertices of the hexiruncicantellated 7-simplex can be most simply positioned in 8-space as permutations of (0,1,1,1,2,3,3,4). This construction is based on facets of the hexiruncicantellated 8-orthoplex, .

Images

Hexisteritruncated 7-simplex

Alternate names
 Peticellitruncated octaexon (acronym: pucto) (Jonathan Bowers)

Coordinates 

The vertices of the hexisteritruncated 7-simplex can be most simply positioned in 8-space as permutations of (0,1,1,2,2,2,3,4). This construction is based on facets of the hexisteritruncated 8-orthoplex, .

Images

Hexistericantellated 7-simplex

Alternate names
 Peticellirhombihexadecaexon (acronym: pucroh) (Jonathan Bowers)

Coordinates 

The vertices of the hexistericantellated 7-simplex can be most simply positioned in 8-space as permutations of (0,1,1,2,2,3,3,4). This construction is based on facets of the hexistericantellated 8-orthoplex, .

Images

Hexipentitruncated 7-simplex

Alternate names
 Petiteritruncated hexadecaexon (acronym: putath) (Jonathan Bowers)

Coordinates 
The vertices of the hexipentitruncated 7-simplex can be most simply positioned in 8-space as permutations of (0,1,2,2,2,2,3,4). This construction is based on facets of the hexipentitruncated 8-orthoplex, .

Images

Hexiruncicantitruncated 7-simplex

Alternate names
 Petigreatoprismated octaexon (acronym: pugopo) (Jonathan Bowers)

Coordinates 

The vertices of the hexiruncicantitruncated 7-simplex can be most simply positioned in 8-space as permutations of (0,1,1,2,2,3,4,5). This construction is based on facets of the hexiruncicantitruncated 8-orthoplex, .

Images

Hexistericantitruncated 7-simplex

Alternate names 
 Peticelligreatorhombated octaexon (acronym: pucagro) (Jonathan Bowers)

Coordinates 

The vertices of the hexistericantitruncated 7-simplex can be most simply positioned in 8-space as permutations of (0,1,1,2,2,3,4,5). This construction is based on facets of the hexistericantitruncated 8-orthoplex, .

Images

Hexisteriruncitruncated 7-simplex

Alternate names
 Peticelliprismatotruncated octaexon (acronym: pucpato) (Jonathan Bowers)

Coordinates 

The vertices of the hexisteriruncitruncated 7-simplex can be most simply positioned in 8-space as permutations of (0,1,1,2,3,3,4,5). This construction is based on facets of the hexisteriruncitruncated 8-orthoplex, .

Images

Hexisteriruncicantellated 7-simplex

Alternate names
 Peticelliprismatorhombihexadecaexon (acronym: pucproh) (Jonathan Bowers)

Coordinates 
The vertices of the hexisteriruncitruncated 7-simplex can be most simply positioned in 8-space as permutations of (0,1,1,2,3,4,4,5). This construction is based on facets of the hexisteriruncitruncated 8-orthoplex, .

Images

Hexipenticantitruncated 7-simplex

Alternate names
 Petiterigreatorhombated octaexon (acronym: putagro) (Jonathan Bowers)

Coordinates 
The vertices of the hexipenticantitruncated 7-simplex can be most simply positioned in 8-space as permutations of (0,1,2,2,2,3,4,5). This construction is based on facets of the hexipenticantitruncated 8-orthoplex, .

Images

Hexipentiruncitruncated 7-simplex

Alternate names
 Petiteriprismatotruncated hexadecaexon (acronym: putpath) (Jonathan Bowers)

Coordinates 
The vertices of the hexipentiruncitruncated 7-simplex can be most simply positioned in 8-space as permutations of (0,1,2,2,3,4,4,5). This construction is based on facets of the hexipentiruncitruncated 8-orthoplex, .

Images

Hexisteriruncicantitruncated 7-simplex

Alternate names
 Petigreatocellated octaexon (acronym: pugaco) (Jonathan Bowers)

Coordinates 
The vertices of the hexisteriruncicantitruncated 7-simplex can be most simply positioned in 8-space as permutations of (0,1,1,2,3,4,5,6). This construction is based on facets of the hexisteriruncicantitruncated 8-orthoplex, .

Images

Hexipentiruncicantitruncated 7-simplex

Alternate names
 Petiterigreatoprismated octaexon  (acronym: putgapo) (Jonathan Bowers)

Coordinates 
The vertices of the hexipentiruncicantitruncated 7-simplex can be most simply positioned in 8-space as permutations of (0,1,2,2,3,4,5,6). This construction is based on facets of the hexipentiruncicantitruncated 8-orthoplex, .

Images

Hexipentistericantitruncated 7-simplex

Alternate names
 Petitericelligreatorhombihexadecaexon (acronym: putcagroh) (Jonathan Bowers)

Coordinates 
The vertices of the hexipentistericantitruncated 7-simplex can be most simply positioned in 8-space as permutations of (0,1,2,3,3,4,5,6). This construction is based on facets of the hexipentistericantitruncated 8-orthoplex, .

Images

Omnitruncated 7-simplex 

The omnitruncated 7-simplex is composed of 40320 (8 factorial) vertices and is the largest uniform 7-polytope in the A7 symmetry of the regular 7-simplex. It can also be called the hexipentisteriruncicantitruncated 7-simplex which is the long name for the omnitruncation for 7 dimensions, with all reflective mirrors active.

Permutohedron and related tessellation 

The omnitruncated 7-simplex is the permutohedron of order 8. The omnitruncated 7-simplex is a zonotope, the Minkowski sum of eight line segments parallel to the eight lines through the origin and the eight vertices of the 7-simplex.

Like all uniform omnitruncated n-simplices, the omnitruncated 7-simplex can tessellate space by itself, in this case 7-dimensional space with three facets around each ridge.

Alternate names
 Great petated hexadecaexon (Acronym: guph) (Jonathan Bowers)

Coordinates 
The vertices of the omnitruncated 7-simplex can be most simply positioned in 8-space as permutations of (0,1,2,3,4,5,6,7).  This construction is based on facets of the hexipentisteriruncicantitruncated 8-orthoplex, t0,1,2,3,4,5,6{36,4}, .

Images

Related polytopes 

These polytope are a part of 71 uniform 7-polytopes with A7 symmetry.

Notes

References 
 H.S.M. Coxeter: 
 H.S.M. Coxeter, Regular Polytopes, 3rd Edition, Dover New York, 1973 
 Kaleidoscopes: Selected Writings of H.S.M. Coxeter, edited by F. Arthur Sherk, Peter McMullen, Anthony C. Thompson, Asia Ivic Weiss, Wiley-Interscience Publication, 1995, wiley.com
 (Paper 22) H.S.M. Coxeter, Regular and Semi Regular Polytopes I, [Math. Zeit. 46 (1940) 380-407, MR 2,10]
 (Paper 23) H.S.M. Coxeter, Regular and Semi-Regular Polytopes II, [Math. Zeit. 188 (1985) 559-591]
 (Paper 24) H.S.M. Coxeter, Regular and Semi-Regular Polytopes III, [Math. Zeit. 200 (1988) 3-45]
 Norman Johnson Uniform Polytopes, Manuscript (1991)
 N.W. Johnson: The Theory of Uniform Polytopes and Honeycombs, PhD (1966)
  x3o3o3o3o3o3x - suph, x3x3o3o3o3o3x- puto, x3o3x3o3o3o3x - puro, x3o3o3x3o3o3x - puph, x3o3o3o3x3o3x - pugro, x3x3x3o3o3o3x - pupato, x3o3x3x3o3o3x - pupro, x3x3o3o3x3o3x - pucto, x3o3x3o3x3o3x - pucroh, x3x3o3o3o3x3x - putath, x3x3x3x3o3o3x - pugopo, x3x3x3o3x3o3x - pucagro, x3x3o3x3x3o3x - pucpato, x3o3x3x3x3o3x - pucproh, x3x3x3o3o3x3x - putagro, x3x3x3x3o3x3x - putpath, x3x3x3x3x3o3x - pugaco, x3x3x3x3o3x3x - putgapo, x3x3x3o3x3x3x - putcagroh, x3x3x3x3x3x3x - guph

External links 
 Polytopes of Various Dimensions
 Multi-dimensional Glossary

7-polytopes